Bond Street is a sett street that runs east to west, between Broadway and Bowery, in the NoHo neighborhood of Lower Manhattan, New York City.

History 

The actual namesake of the street is undetermined.

24 Bond Street was the location of Beatrice and Sam Rivers' studio RivBea and of Robert Mapplethorpe's first studio. Mile End Sandwich, a spin-off restaurant of Mile End Delicatessen, the Jewish deli in Brooklyn, is located on Bond Street between Bowery and Lafayette Street. More recently, Bond Street became the location of stores for Billy Reid and Drake's OVO Clothing clothing brand.

References

External links

Greenwich Village
Streets in Manhattan
East Village, Manhattan